This article shows a list of professional rugby league clubs in Britain. It includes every team playing in levels 1–4 of the British rugby league system. Competitions listed are correct as of the 2021 season.

League System

Super League (level 1)
Championship (level 2)
League 1 (level 3)
National Conference League and Conference League South (level 4)
Various Regional Leagues (level 5)

Alphabetically

A

B

C

D

E

F

G

H

I

K

L

M

N

O

P

R

S

T

U

V

W

Y

See also

List of rugby league clubs in Australia
List of rugby league clubs in France
List of rugby league clubs in New Zealand

References

United Kingdom
Rugby league
Rugby league
Clubs
British rugby league teams